Crime prevention through environmental design (CPTED) is an agenda for manipulating the built environment to create safer neighborhoods.

It originated in America around 1960, when urban renewal strategies were felt to be destroying the social framework needed for self-policing. Architect Oscar Newman created the concept of ‘defensible space’, developed further by criminologist C. Ray Jeffery who coined the term CPTED. Growing interest in environmental criminology led to detailed study of specific topics such as natural surveillance, access control and territoriality. The "broken window" principle that neglected zones invite crime reinforced the need for good property maintenance to assert visible ownership of space. Appropriate environmental design can also increase the perceived likelihood of detection and apprehension, known to be the biggest single deterrent to crime. There has also been new interest in the interior design of prisons as an environment that significantly affects decisions to offend.

Wide-ranging recommendations to architects include the planting of trees and shrubs, the elimination of escape routes, the correct use of lighting, and the encouragement of pedestrian and bicycle traffic in streets. Tests show that the application of CPTED measures overwhelmingly reduces criminal activity.

History
CPTED was originally coined and formulated by criminologist C. Ray Jeffery.  A more limited approach, termed defensible space, was developed concurrently by architect Oscar Newman. Both men built on the previous work of Elizabeth Wood, Jane Jacobs and Schlomo Angel.  Jeffery's book, "Crime Prevention Through Environmental Design" came out in 1971, but his work was ignored throughout the 1970s. Newman's book, "Defensible Space: – Crime Prevention through Urban Design" came out in 1972. His principles were widely adopted but with mixed success.  The defensible space approach was subsequently revised with additional built environment approaches supported by CPTED.  Newman represented this as CPTED and credited Jeffery as the originator of the CPTED term.  Newman's CPTED-improved defensible space approach enjoyed broader success and resulted in a reexamination of Jeffery's work.  Jeffery continued to expand the multi-disciplinary aspects of the approach, advances which he published, with the last one published in 1990. The Jeffery CPTED model is more comprehensive than the Newman CPTED model, which limits itself to the built environment.   Later models of CPTED were developed based on the Newman Model, with criminologist Tim Crowe's being the most popular.

, CPTED is popularly understood to refer strictly to the Newman/Crowe type models, with the Jeffery model treated more as multi-disciplinary approach to crime prevention which incorporates biology and psychology, a situation accepted even by Jeffery himself. (Robinson, 1996). A revision of CPTED, initiated in 1997, termed 2nd Generation CPTED, adapts CPTED to offender individuality, further indication that Jeffery's work is not popularly considered to be already a part of CPTED. In 2012 Woodbridge introduced and developed CPTED in prison and showed how design flaws allowed criminals to keep offending.

1960s
In the 1960s Elizabeth Wood developed guidelines for addressing security issues while working with the Chicago Housing Authority, placing emphasis on design features that would support natural surveillability. Her guidelines were never implemented but stimulated some of the original thinking that led to CPTED.

Jane Jacobs' book, The Death and Life of Great American Cities (1961) argued that urban diversity and vitality were being destroyed by urban planners and their urban renewal strategies. She was challenging the basic tenets of urban planning of the time: that neighborhoods should be isolated from each other; that an empty street is safer than a crowded one; and that the car represents progress over the pedestrian.  An editor for Architectural Forum magazine (1952–1964), she had no formal training in urban planning, but her work emerged as a founding text for a new way of seeing cities. She felt that the way cities were being designed and built meant that the general public would be unable to develop the social framework needed for effective self-policing. She pointed out that the new forms of urban design broke down many of the traditional controls on criminal behavior, for example, the ability of residents to watch the street and the presence of people using the street both night and day. She suggested that the lack of "natural guardianship" in the environment promoted crime.  Jacobs developed the concept that crime flourishes when people do not meaningfully interact with their neighbors. In Death and Life, Jacobs listed the three attributes needed to make a city street safe: a clear demarcation of private and public space; diversity of use; and a high level of pedestrian use of the sidewalks.

Schlomo Angel was an early pioneer of CPTED and studied under noted planner Christopher Alexander.  Angel's Ph.D. thesis, Discouraging Crime Through City Planning, (1968) was a study of street crime in Oakland, CA.  In it he states "The physical environment can exert a direct influence on crime settings by delineating territories, reducing or increasing accessibility by the creation or elimination of boundaries and circulation networks, and by facilitating surveillance by the citizenry and the police." He asserted that crime was inversely related to the level of activity on the street, and that the commercial strip environment was particularly vulnerable to crime because it thinned out activity, making it easier for individuals to commit street crime.  Angel developed and published CPTED concepts in 1970 in work supported and widely distributed by the United States Department of Justice (Luedtke, 1970).

1970s
The phrase crime prevention through environmental design (CPTED) was first used by C. Ray Jeffery, a criminologist from Florida State University. The phrase began to gain acceptance after the publication of his 1971 book of the same name.

Jeffery's work was based on the precepts of experimental psychology represented in modern learning theory. (Jeffery and Zahm, 1993:329) Jeffery's CPTED concept arose out of his experiences with a rehabilitative project in Washington, D.C. that attempted to control the school environment of juveniles in the area. Rooted deeply in the psychological learning theory of B.F. Skinner, Jeffery's CPTED approach emphasized the role of the physical environment in the development of pleasurable and painful experiences for the offender that would have the capacity to alter behavioral outcomes. His original CPTED model was a stimulus-response (S-R) model positing that the organism learned from punishments and reinforcements in the environment. Jeffery "emphasized material rewards . . . and the use of the physical environment to control behavior" (Jeffery and Zahm, 1993:330). The major idea here was that by removing the reinforcements for crime, it would not occur. (Robinson, 1996)

An often overlooked contribution of Jeffery in his 1971 book is outlining four critical factors in crime prevention that have stood the test of time. These are the degrees to which one can manipulate the opportunity for a crime to occur, the motivation for the crime to occur, the risk to the offender if the crime occurs, and the history of the offender who might consider committing the crime. The first three of these are within the control of the potential victim while the last is not.

For reasons that have received little attention, Jeffery's work was ignored throughout the 1970s. Jeffery's own explanation is that, at a time when the world wanted prescriptive design solutions, his work presented a comprehensive theory and used it to identify a wide range of crime prevention functions that should drive design and management standards.

Concurrent with Jeffery's largely theoretical work was Oscar Newman and George Rand's empirical study of the crime-environment connection conducted in the early 1970s. As an architect, Newman placed emphasis on the specific design features, an emphasis missing in Jeffery's work.  Newman's "Defensible Space – Crime Prevention through Urban Design (1972) includes extensive discussion of crime related to the physical form of housing based on crime data analysis from New York City public housing.  "Defensible Space" changed the nature of the crime prevention and environmental design field and within two years of its publication substantial federal funding was made available to demonstrate and study defensible space concepts.

As established by Newman, defensible space must contain two components. First, defensible space should allow people to see and be seen continuously. Ultimately, this diminishes residents' fear because they know that a potential offender can easily be observed, identified, and consequently, apprehended. Second, people must be willing to intervene or report crime when it occurs. By increasing the sense of security in settings where people live and work, it encourages people to take control of the areas and assume a role of ownership. When people feel safe in their neighborhood they are more likely to interact with one another and intervene when crime occurs.  These remain central to most implementations of CPTED .

In 1977, Jeffery's second edition of Crime Prevention Through Environmental Design expanded his theoretical approach to embrace a more complex model of behavior in which variable physical environments, offender behavior as individuals and behavior of individual members of the general public have reciprocal influences on one another.  This laid the foundation for Jeffery to develop a behavioral model aimed at predicting the effects of modifying both the external environment and the internal environment of individual offenders.

1980s
By the 1980s, the defensible space prescriptions of the 1970s were determined to have mixed effectiveness. They worked best in residential settings, especially in settings where the residents were relatively free to respond to cues to increase social interaction.  Defensible space design tools were observed to be marginally effective in institutional and commercial settings. As a result, Newman and others moved to improve defensible space, adding CPTED based features.  They also deemphasised less effective aspects of defensible space.  Contributions to the advance of CPTED in the 1980s included:

The "broken windows" theory, put forth by James Q. Wilson and George L. Kelling in 1982, explored the impact that visible deterioration and neglect in neighborhoods have on behavior.  Property maintenance was added as a CPTED strategy on par with surveillance, access control and territoriality. The Broken Windows theory may go hand in hand with CPTED. Crime is attracted to the areas that are not taken care of or abandoned.  CPTED adds a pride of ownership feeling to the community. With no more "broken windows" in certain neighborhoods, crime will continue to decline and eventually fall out completely.
Canadian academicians Patricia and Paul Brantingham published Environmental Criminology in 1981. According to the authors, a crime takes place when all of the essential elements are present. These elements consist of: a law, an offender, a target, and a place. They characterize these as "the four dimensions of crime", with environmental criminology studying the last of the four dimensions.
British criminologists Ronald V. Clarke and Patricia Mayhew developed their "situational crime prevention" approach: reducing opportunity to offend by improving design and management of the environment.
Criminologist Timothy Crowe developed his CPTED training programs.

1990s
Criminology: An Interdisciplinary Approach (1990), was Jeffery's final contribution to CPTED. The Jeffery CPTED model evolved to one which assumes that
The environment never influences behavior directly, but only through the brain. Any model of crime prevention must include both the brain and the physical environment. ... Because the approach contained in Jeffery's CPTED model is today based on many fields, including scientific knowledge of modern brain sciences, a focus on only external environmental crime prevention is inadequate as it ignores another entire dimension of CPTED – i.e., the internal environment. (Robinson, 1996)

Crime Prevention Through Environmental Design (1991) by criminologist Tim Crowe provided a solid base for CPTED to move forward into the rest of the 1990s.

From 1994 through 2002, Sparta Consulting Corporation led by Severin Sorensen, CPP managed the US Government's largest CPTED technical assistance and training program titled Crime Prevention Through Environmental Design (CPTED) in Public Housing Technical Assistance and Training Program, funded by the US Department of Housing and Urban Development. During this period Sorensen worked with Ronald V. Clarke and the Sparta team to develop a new CPTED Curriculum that used Situational Crime Prevention as an underlying theoretical basis for CPTED measures. A curriculum was developed and trained to stakeholders in public and assisted housing, and follow-up CPTED assessments were conducted at various sites. The Sparta-led CPTED projects showed statistical reductions in self reported FBI UCR Part I crimes between 17% to 76% depending on the basket of CPTED measures employed in specific high crime, low income settings in the United States.

In 1996, Oscar Newman published an update to his earlier CPTED works, titled, Creating Defensible Space, Institute for Community Design Analysis, Office of Planning and Development Research (PDR), US Department of Housing and Urban Development (HUD).

In 1997, an article by Greg Saville and Gerry Cleveland, 2nd Generation CPTED, exhorted CPTED practitioners to consider the original social ecology origins of CPTED, including social and psychological issues beyond the built environment.

2000s
, elements of the CPTED approach had gained wide international acceptance due to law enforcement efforts to embrace it. The CPTED term "environment" is commonly used to refer to the external environment of the place. Jeffery's intention that CPTED also embrace the internal environment of the offender seems to have been lost, even on those promoting the expansion of CPTED to include social ecology and psychology under the banner of 2nd Generation CPTED.

In 2012 Woodbridge introduced and developed the concept of CPTED within a prison environment, a place where crime still continues after conviction. Jeffery's understanding of the criminal mind from his study in rehabilitative facilities over forty years ago was now being used to reduce crime in those same type of facilities. Woodbridge showed how prison design allowed offending to continue and introduced changes to reduce crime.

CPTED techniques are increasingly benefiting from integration with design technologies. For instance, models of proposed buildings developed in Building Information Modelling may be imported into video game engines to assess their resilience to different forms of crime.

Strategies for the built environment
CPTED strategies rely upon the ability to influence offender decisions that precede criminal acts. Research into criminal behavior shows that the decision to offend or not to offend is more influenced by cues to the perceived risk of being caught than by cues to reward or ease of entry. Certainty of being caught is the main deterrence for criminals not the severity of the punishment so by raising the certainty of being captured, criminal actions will decrease. Consistent with this research, CPTED based strategies emphasise enhancing the perceived risk of detection and apprehension.

Consistent with the widespread implementation of defensible space guidelines in the 1970s, most implementations of CPTED  were based solely upon the theory that the proper design and effective use of the built environment can reduce crime, reduce the fear of crime, and improve the quality of life.  Built environment implementations of CPTED seek to dissuade offenders from committing crimes by manipulating the built environment in which those crimes proceed from or occur.   The six main concepts according to Moffat are territoriality, surveillance, access control, image/maintenance, activity support and target hardening. Applying all of these strategies is key when trying to prevent crime in any neighborhood crime ridden or not.

Natural surveillance and access control strategies limit the opportunity for crime. Territorial reinforcement promotes social control through a variety of measures. Image/maintenance and activity support provide the community with reassurance and the ability to inhibit crime by citizen activities. Target hardening strategies round up all of these techniques to resolve crime into one final step.

Natural surveillance

Natural surveillance increases the perceived risk of attempting deviant actions by improving visibility of potential offenders to the general public. Natural surveillance occurs by designing the placement of physical features, activities and people in such a way as to maximize visibility of the space and its users, fostering positive social interaction among legitimate users of private and public space.  Potential offenders feel increased scrutiny, and thus inherently perceive an increase in risk. This perceived increase in risk extends to the perceived lack of viable and covert escape routes.
Design streets to increase pedestrian and bicycle traffic
Place windows overlooking sidewalks and parking lots.
Leave window shades open.
Use passing vehicular traffic as a surveillance asset.
Create landscape designs that provide surveillance, especially in proximity to designated points of entry and opportunistic points of entry.
Use the shortest, least sight-limiting fence appropriate for the situation.
Use transparent weather vestibules at building entrances.
When creating lighting design, avoid poorly placed lights that create blind-spots for potential observers and miss critical areas. Ensure potential problem areas are well lit: pathways, stairs, entrances/exits, parking areas, ATMs, phone kiosks, mailboxes, bus stops, children's play areas, recreation areas, pools, laundry rooms, storage areas, dumpster and recycling areas, etc.
Avoid too-bright security lighting that creates blinding glare and/or deep shadows, hindering the view for potential observers. Eyes adapt to night lighting and have trouble adjusting to severe lighting disparities. Using lower intensity lights often requires more fixtures.
Use shielded or cut-off luminaires to control glare.
Place lighting along pathways and other pedestrian-use areas at proper heights for lighting the faces of the people in the space (and to identify the faces of potential attackers).
Utilizing curved streets with multiple view points to multiple houses' entrances, as well as making the escape route difficult to follow.

Natural surveillance measures can be complemented by mechanical and organizational measures.  For example, closed-circuit television (CCTV) cameras can be added in areas where window surveillance is unavailable.

Natural access control

Natural access control limits the opportunity for crime by taking steps to clearly differentiate between public space and private space. By selectively placing entrances and exits, fencing, lighting and landscape to limit access or control flow, natural access control occurs.
Use a single, clearly identifiable, point of entry
Use structures to divert persons to reception areas
Incorporate maze entrances in public restrooms.  This avoids the isolation that is produced by an anteroom or double door entry system
Use low, thorny bushes beneath ground level windows. Use rambling or climbing thorny plants next to fences to discourage intrusion.
Eliminate design features that provide access to roofs or upper levels
In the front yard, use waist-level, picket-type fencing along residential property lines to control access, encourage surveillance.
Use a locking gate between front and backyards.
Use shoulder-level, open-type fencing along lateral residential property lines between side yards and extending to between back yards.  They should be sufficiently unencumbered with landscaping to promote social interaction between neighbors.
Use substantial, high, closed fencing (for example, masonry) between a backyard and a public alley instead of a wall which blocks the view from all angles.

Natural access control is used to complement mechanical and operational access control measures, such as target hardening.

Natural territorial reinforcement

Territorial reinforcement promotes social control through increased definition of space and improved proprietary concern.
An environment designed to clearly delineate private space does two things. First, it creates a sense of ownership. Owners have a vested interest and are more likely to challenge intruders or report them to the police. Second, the sense of owned space creates an environment where "strangers" or "intruders" stand out and are more easily identified.  By using buildings, fences, pavement, signs, lighting and landscape to express ownership and define public, semi-public and private space, natural territorial reinforcement occurs. Additionally, these objectives can be achieved by assignment of space to designated users in previously unassigned locations.

Maintained premises and landscaping such that it communicates an alert and active presence occupying the space.
Provide trees in residential areas.  Research results indicate that, contrary to traditional views within the law enforcement community, outdoor residential spaces with more trees are seen as significantly more attractive, more safe, and more likely to be used than similar spaces without trees.
Restrict private activities to defined private areas.
Display security system signage at access points.
Avoid chain link fencing and razor-wire fence topping, as it communicates the absence of a physical presence and a reduced risk of being detected.
Placing amenities such as seating or refreshments in common areas in a commercial or institutional setting helps to attract larger numbers of desired users.
Scheduling activities in common areas increases proper use, attracts more people and increases the perception that these areas are controlled.
Motion sensor lights at all entry points into the residence.

Territorial reinforcement measures make the normal user feel safe and make the potential offender aware of a substantial risk of apprehension or scrutiny. When people take pride in what they own and go to the proper measures to protect their belongings, crime is deterred from those areas because now it makes it more of a challenge.

Other CPTED elements
Maintenance and activity support aspects of CPTED were touched upon in the preceding, but are often treated separately because they are not physical design elements within the built environment.

Maintenance
Maintenance is an expression of ownership of property.  Deterioration indicates less control by the intended users of a site and indicate a greater tolerance of disorder.  The Broken Windows Theory is a valuable tool in understanding the importance of maintenance in deterring crime.  Broken  Windows theory proponents support a zero tolerance approach to property maintenance, observing that the presence of a broken window will entice vandals to break more windows in the vicinity.  The sooner broken windows are fixed, the less likely it is that such vandalism will occur in the future. Vandalism falls into the broken windows category as well. The faster the graffiti is painted over, the less likely one is to repeat because no one saw what has been done. Having a positive image in the community shows a sense of pride and self-worth that no one can take away from the owner of the property.

Activity support
Activity support increases the use of a built environment for safe activities with the intent of increasing the risk of detection of criminal and undesirable activities.  Natural surveillance by the intended users is casual and there is no specific plan for people to watch out for criminal activity. By placing signs such as caution children playing and signs for certain activities in the area, the citizens of that area will be more involved in what is happening around them. They will be more tuned in to who is and who isn't supposed to be there and what looks suspicious.

Effectiveness and criticism
CPTED strategies are most successful when they inconvenience the end user the least and when the CPTED design process relies upon the combined efforts of environmental designers, land managers, community activists, and law enforcement professionals. The strategies listed above can't be fulfilled without the community's help and it requires the whole community in the location to make the environment a safer place to live. A meta-analysis of multiple-component CPTED initiatives in the United States has found that they have decreased robberies between 30 and 84% (Casteel and Peek-Asa, 2000).

In terms of effectiveness, a more accurate title for the strategy would be crime deterrence through environmental design. Research demonstrates that offenders might not always be prevented from committing some crimes by using CPTED.  CPTED relies upon changes to the physical environment that will cause an offender to make certain behavioral decisions, and some of those decisions will include desisting from crime. Those changes deter rather than conclusively "prevent" behavior.

CPTED may stereotype local homeless populations in areas where it is implemented. Such persons may be unable or unwilling to care for their personal appearances. They also may be judged to have fewer compunctions from committing property crimes, due to either mental or financial difficulties, based on common stereotypes of homeless persons.

See also
 Copenhagenization
 Crime-Free Multi-Housing
 
 Environmental psychology
 Hostile architecture
 Urban vitality

Notes

References

 Angel, Schlomo. (1968). Discouraging Crime Through City Planning. (Paper No. 75). Berkeley, CA: Center for Planning and Development Research, University of California at Berkeley.
 Atlas, Randall (Ed). (2008). 21st Century Security and CPTED: Designing for Critical Infrastructure Protection and Crime Prevention, CRC Press, Taylor & Francis Ltd.
Atlas, R. (1991), "The other side of defensible space", security Management, March, pp. 63–6
 Crowe, Tim. (2000). Crime Prevention Through Environmental Design. 2nd edition. Boston: Butterworth – Heinman. 
 Jacobs, Jane. (1961). The Death and Life of Great American Cities. New York: Random House. 
 Jeffery, C. Ray. (1971). Crime Prevention Through Environmental Design. Beverly Hills, CA: Sage Publications.
 Jeffery, C. Ray. (1977). Crime Prevention Through Environmental Design. Beverly Hills, CA: Sage Publications.
 Jeffery, C. Ray. (1990). Criminology: An Interdisciplinary Approach. Englewood Cliffs, NJ: Prentice-Hall.
 Luedtke, Gerald and Associates. (1970). Crime and the Physical City: Neighborhood Design Techniques for Crime Reduction. Washington D.C.: U.S. Department of Justice.
Moffat, R. (1983), "Crime prevention through environmental design – a management perspective", Canadian Journal of Criminology, Vol. 25 No. 4, pp. 19–31. 
 Newman, Oscar. (1972). Defensible Space: Crime Prevention Through Urban Design. New York: Macmillan. 
 Newman, Oscar. (1996). ]http://www.huduser.org/publications/pdf/def.pdf Creating Defensible Space], Institute for Community Design Analysis, Office of Planning and Development Research (PDR), US Department of Housing and Urban Development (HUD), Washington, DC.
O'Grady, W. (2011). Crime in Canadian Context: Debates and Controversies. (2nd ed.) ON: Oxford University Press.
 Robinson, Matthew B. (1996). "The Theoretical Development of 'CPTED': 25 Years of Responses to C. Ray Jeffery". Appears in: Advances in Criminological Theory, Vol. 8. Url last accessed on May 6, 2006.
 Saskatoon,City of (2010). Safe Growth and CPTED in Saskatoon. Available online at https://web.archive.org/web/20120813034408/http://www.saskatoon.ca/DEPARTMENTS/Community%20Services/PlanningDevelopment/Documents/Neighbourhood%20Planning/Neighbourhood%20Safety/CPTED%20Guidelines_WEB.pdf.  
 Sorensen, Severin; Hayes, John G; Walsh Ellen W, and Marina Myhre, (1995, 1997, 1998, 2000 editions) Crime Prevention Through Environmental Design (CPTED):Workbook, (U.S. Department of Housing and Urban Development, Community Safety and Conservation Division; Washington, DC).
 Wood, Elizabeth. (1961). Housing Design: A Social Theory. New York: Citizens' Housing and Planning Counsel of New York.
 Wood, Elizabeth. (1967). Social Aspects of Housing in Urban Development.  ST/SOA/71, Department of Economic and Social Affairs, United Nations, New York.

External links
International CPTED Association
 European Designing Out Crime Association
Stichting Veilig Ontwerp en Beheer (the Netherlands)
Crime prevention and the built environment.
 Washington State University CPTED Annotated Bibliography. Url last accessed May 6, 2006.
 https://www.crcpress.com/21st-Century-Security-and-CPTED-Designing-for-Critical-Infrastructure-Protection/Atlas/p/book/9781439880210

Criminology
Environmental psychology
Security engineering
Crime prevention
Urban design